The 1988 Boise State Broncos football team represented Boise State University in the 1988 NCAA Division I-AA football season. The Broncos competed in the Big Sky Conference and played their home games at Bronco Stadium in Boise, Idaho. The Broncos were led by second-year head coach Skip Hall, Boise State finished the season 8–4 overall and 5–3 in conference.

The Big Sky Conference had three teams in the 16–team playoffs for the first time.

In the rivalry game with second-ranked Idaho at Bronco Stadium on November 19, a conference attendance record of 23,687 was set, but the Vandals won for the seventh consecutive year.

Schedule

Roster

References

External links
 Bronco Football Stats – 1988

Boise State
Boise State Broncos football seasons
Boise State Broncos football